Qualitative Health Research is a peer-reviewed medical journal that covers the field of public health. The editor-in-chief is Janice M. Morse (University of Utah). It was established in 1991 and is published by SAGE Publications.

Abstracting and indexing
The journal is abstracted and indexed in Scopus and the Science Citation Index Expanded. According to the Journal Citation Reports, its 2021 impact factor is 4.233.

References

External links
 

SAGE Publishing academic journals
English-language journals
Monthly journals
Public health journals
Publications established in 1991
Qualitative research journals